The Highland Railway Strath Class were 4-4-0 steam locomotives introduced in 1892, to the design of David Jones.

Construction
Twelve were built by Neilson and Company and delivered between May and July 1892.

Design
They were identical to the class E Clyde Bogies apart from having boilers of a larger diameter which allowed an increased heating surface.

Numbering

Transfer to LMS
Half of the class survived to be taken over by the London, Midland and Scottish Railway (LMS) at the 1923 Grouping but the last was withdrawn in 1930.

References

Strath Class
4-4-0 locomotives
Neilson locomotives
Railway locomotives introduced in 1892
Scrapped locomotives
Passenger locomotives